John Walter Hendrix (born September 22, 1942) is a retired United States Army four-star general who served as Commander, United States Army Forces Command from 1999 to 2001.

Early life and education
Hendrix was born on September 22, 1942, in Bulloch County, Georgia, and received his commission after graduating from the Georgia Institute of Technology in 1965 with a degree in electrical engineering. Hendrix is of English, Scottish and Italian descent. He earned a master's degree in history in 1978 from Middle Tennessee State University, and is a graduate of both the United States Army War College and the United States Army Command and General Staff College.

Military career
Hendrix's commands include V Corps; Task Force Hawk; 3rd Infantry Division, Fort Stewart, Georgia; and the United States Army Infantry Center, Fort Benning, Georgia.

Hendrix also served as deputy chief of staff for operations, United States Army Europe and 7th Army; assistant division commander, 1st Armored Division during the Gulf War; executive officer to the Supreme Allied Commander Europe, Supreme Headquarters Allied Powers Europe, Belgium; and assistant commandant, United States Army Infantry School, Fort Benning.

Hendrix completed several NATO assignments during the Cold War, including commander of 2nd Brigade, 8th Infantry Division, and served two tours of duty as a rifle company commander in the Republic of Vietnam. He retired from the army in 2001.

Awards and decorations

Post-military
In retirement, Hendrix sits on the board of advisors of the National Infantry Foundation, and worked for United Defense Industries. He was National Chairman of the Military Officers Association of America.

References

1942 births
Living people
United States Army generals
United States Army personnel of the Vietnam War
Recipients of the Defense Distinguished Service Medal
Recipients of the Distinguished Service Medal (US Army)
Recipients of the Silver Star
Recipients of the Legion of Merit
Georgia Tech alumni
United States Army aviators
Middle Tennessee State University alumni
People from Bulloch County, Georgia
United States Army Command and General Staff College alumni
United States Army personnel of the Gulf War